Searchlight was founded in 1933 by Matron Powell, successor to Dame Grace Kimmins, as a set of workshops and home to teach useful skills and formed under the auspices of the Chailey Heritage. It was founded because Matron Powell realised that once the boys were 15 they were thrown out into the world unprepared to make their way.

History
The Duchess of Norfolk became a patron and opened a second building in 1951. The Queen visited in July 1962.

Present day
Searchlight undertakes printing and small assembly work as well as making garden furniture and bird tables etc. It participates in an East Sussex apprentice scheme.

Currently (2009) there are three residential houses, which accommodate forty-seven, and a day centre.

Location
Searchlight is located on Mount Pleasant, the hill behind the East Beach at Denton.

External links
Official website

Notes

Organizations established in 1933
Charities for disabled people based in the United Kingdom
Charities based in East Sussex